Anai Ayya brothers were two brothers, who lived in the 19th century Tamil Nadu, and were composers of Carnatic music. Anai Iyer and Annavaiyyar composed both in Telugu and Tamil and used the mudra Umadasa.

The Anai Ayya brothers were close contemporaries of the great composer Tyagaraja and were related to Maha Vaidyanatha Iyer. They lived in Vaiyacheri and Tiruvaiyaru in the Thanjavur district. They were patronised by the king Serfoji II of Thanjavur. Together they wrote at least 26 Tamil and 12 Telugu compositions that are currently available. Their compositions had the theme of devotion sprinkled with philosophy. Their songs were in praise of Siva and his consort.

Some of their popular compositions are Ambanannu (Todi), Inta paraakaa (Mayamalavagoula), Paruvam paarkka nyaayamaa (Dhanyasi), Saranu saranu (Jhenjooti) and Mahima teliya taramaa (Sankarabharanam).

One of the last contributions that T. Viswanathan and T. Sankaran made to Carnatic music was to edit the compositions of the Anai Ayya brothers (published by Brihaddhvani).

See also

List of Carnatic composers

References
 carnatica.net

Carnatic composers
Sibling musical duos